Sitak is a Russian surname. Notable people with the surname include:

Artem Sitak (born 1986), New Zealand tennis player, younger brother of Dmitri
Dmitri Sitak (born 1983), Russian tennis player, older brother of Artem

Russian-language surnames